Ofra Haza is an eponymous 1997 album by Israeli singer Ofra Haza.  The album was produced by Frank Peterson (of Enigma and Gregorian), recorded both in Hamburg as well as at legendary Abbey Road Studios in London, and includes the single release "Show Me", an updated version of "Im Nin' Alu", songs co-written by Peterson, Haza and manager Bezalel Aloni as well as a cover version of Carole King's "You've Got a Friend". Although Haza continued recording until 1999, mainly songs for movie soundtracks and collaborations with other artists, this was to be her final full-length studio album before her death in 2000.

Track listing
"Show Me" (Aloni, Haza, Peterson) - 4:12 
"Amore" (Aloni, Haza) - 4:31 
"Im Nin' Alu 2000" (Traditional) - 3:38 
"Sixth Sense" (Aloni, Haza, Peterson) - 4:12 
"My Ethiopian Boy" (Aloni, Haza) - 4:37 
"Ahava" (Aloni, Haza, Peterson) - 6:56 
"No Time to Hate" (Aloni, Haza, Peterson) - 4:24 
"You've Got a Friend" (King) - 5:16 
"You" (Aloni, Haza, Peterson) - 5:06 
"Give Me a Sign" (Aloni, Haza, Peterson) - 4:20 
"One Day" (Aloni, Haza, Peterson) - 4:17

Personnel
 Pino Palladino - bass guitar
 Peter Weihe - guitar
 Frank Peterson - keyboards & programming
 Matthias Meissner - keyboards & programming
 Thomas Schwarz - keyboards & programming
 Tony Harrison - narrator trk 11
 Sarah Brightman - vocalizing in the background  /track 10/

Production
 Frank Peterson - record producer, sound mix 
 Recorded January–August 1997 at Nemo Studios Hamburg and Abbey Road Studios London.

References

1997 albums
Ofra Haza albums
Albums produced by Frank Peterson